Eleventh Five-Year Plan may refer to:
 The Eleventh Five-Year Plan (People's Republic of China), began in 2006 and ended in 2010
 The Eleventh Five-Year Plan (India), began in 2007 and ended in 2012
 The Eleventh Five-Year Plan (Soviet Union), began in 1981 and ended in 1985